Chasminodes is a genus of moths of the family Noctuidae.

Species
 Chasminodes aino Sugi, 1956
 Chasminodes albonitens Bremer
 Chasminodes annamica
 Chasminodes atrata Butler
 Chasminodes behouneki Kononenko, 2009
 Chasminodes bremeri
 Chasminodes cilia Staudinger
 Chasminodes japonica
 Chasminodes nervosa Butler
 Chasminodes nigrifascia
 Chasminodes nigrilinea Leech
 Chasminodes nigrostigma
 Chasminodes niveus
 Chasminodes pseudalbonitens Sugi
 Chasminodes sugii Koronenko
 Chasminodes unipuncta Sugi
 Chasminodes ussurica

References
 Kononenko, V. (2009). "Two new species of the subfamily Xyleninae from China (Lepidoptera, Noctuidae)." Zootaxa 1993: 53-60. 
 Natural History Museum Lepidoptera genus database

Xyleninae